Grytting is a village in Hadsel Municipality in Nordland county, Norway.  The village is located on the island of Langøya on the northern shore of the Hadselfjorden.  It is located approximately half-way between the towns of Stokmarknes and Sortland; just south of the village of Gjerstad.

Most of the inhabitants in Grytting are employed in either agriculture or the fishing industry.  Elbjørg has a home bakery there, and her bread is known locally to be one of the best in that area.   One Horse Centre (Grytting Hestesenter og hovslager) is located there as well, just across the road of Elbjørg's home bakery.

Cross country skiing and ski jumping are common sports. A local school served children here until 1989, but it was closed and is now used as a kindergarten.

In the Viking era there was a large settlement here, with only some ruins left today.  A local guide is needed since it is quite hidden. The only things to be seen are some old Viking graves around the Lunnan area.

The area was inhabited early due to a lagoon, perfect for boats in bad weather.  Wildlife includes fresh water fish (trout, salmon), sea fish (cod, coalfish, crustacean), grouse, and moose.  It is an attractive area for fishing and hunting.

References

Hadsel
Villages in Nordland
Populated places of Arctic Norway